Al Kaabi is an Arab tribal name, the Bani Kaab. It originated from the notably large tribe Banu 'Amir 

Jabir al-Kaabi (died 1881), Arab tribal leader 
Maz'al Jabir al-kaabi (died 1897), Arab tribal leader who ruled part of modern-day Iran
Mohamed Faraj Al-Kaabi (born 1984), Qatari hammer thrower
Fadhil Abbas al-Ka'bi (born 1955), Iraqi children's writer and poet